Freziera cordata is a species of plant in the Pentaphylacaceae family. It is found in Dominica, Guadeloupe, and Martinique.

References

cordata
Vulnerable plants
Taxonomy articles created by Polbot
Taxa named by Edmond Tulasne